Live at 5:30 is a Canadian television news program that airs weekdays on CP24 from 5:30 - 6:00 p.m.  Starting in July 2017, CTV Toronto started to simulcast the program in addition to the earlier Live at 5.

History
Live at 5:30 was created as a result of budget cuts at Rogers Media's Citytv stations across Canada which included the cancellation of their 5 p.m. newscast for Toronto, the program first aired on January 19, 2010.

Set
The CP24 studio is located on the second floor of 299 Queen Street West. Large north-facing windows look out towards Queen Street. The set and newsroom is home to Live at 5:30 and most of the other CP24-produced programming.

Current presenters
 Host(s): Rotating anchors
 Weather: Chris Potter (meteorologist)
 Traffic:

See also
 Live at 5 (Canadian TV program)

External links
 CP24
 CTV Announcement: CP24 Now Offers Toronto Viewers More Early News With LIVE AT 5 and LIVE AT 5:30

2010s Canadian television news shows
2010 Canadian television series debuts
Canadian talk radio programs
2020s Canadian television news shows